Dan Bonner is an analyst and color commentator covering NCAA men's basketball and the NBA. He previously played basketball at the University of Virginia and coached the UVa women's team for two seasons. He also coached girls' basketball and soccer at Robert E. Lee High School in Staunton, Virginia.

Playing career
Dan Bonner, a Pittsburgh native, played at Avonworth High School. He attended the University of Virginia and played basketball from 1971 to 1975. In 1975 he was named captain and was named to the Academic All-Atlantic Coast Conference team.

Coaching career
After his playing career, Dan Bonner was an assistant coach under Barbara Kelly at the University of Virginia for the first two seasons of women's basketball ever played. He succeeded her as head coach in 1975 leading the women's team to a 32–20 (.615) record over two seasons at the helm.

Television career
He serves as an analyst for regular-season college basketball games for CBS Sports, ESPN (1987–2001), Fox Sports, Raycom Sports and the ACC Network. Bonner began calling ACC games for Jefferson Pilot Sports in 1983 while a manager at a Social Security office in Staunton, Virginia. 

Beginning in 1985, Bonner covered games for NCAA Productions' broadcasts of the NCAA Tournament.
Starting with the 1991 NCAA Tournament, Bonner began calling tournament games for CBS. Bonner has worked alongside many partners for the NCAA tournament, but his most frequent pairing has been with Kevin Harlan from 2004-2012 and again from 2015-present.

He is quoted as saying, "The Monday after Selection Sunday, I'm scrambling to learn all the teams that I'll have to do later in the week. And then I'm out on the road."

His other broadcasting work includes play-by-play for baseball's Carolina League, women's college basketball, soccer play-by-play and an announcer for The ACC Regional Sports Networks coverage of ACC Baseball.

Personal
He was the assistant athletic director and assistant girls' soccer coach for Robert E. Lee High School (2004–2007), having previously coached the girls' basketball team from 1999 to 2003. He was named the Virginia Group AA Coach of the Year for the 2002–03 season.

Dan is married to the former Terry Israel, who was the team captain and MVP of the 1975–76 Lady Cavaliers team. The Bonners have three children: Coleman, Keary and Sarah.
He also was head coach for the West Point High School Basketball Team in West Point, Virginia.

References

Year of birth missing (living people)
Living people
American television sports announcers
Minor League Baseball broadcasters
Basketball coaches from Pennsylvania
Basketball players from Pittsburgh
College basketball announcers in the United States
High school basketball coaches in Virginia
People from Staunton, Virginia
Sportspeople from Pittsburgh
Virginia Cavaliers men's basketball players
Virginia Cavaliers women's basketball coaches
Women's college basketball announcers in the United States
American women's basketball coaches
American men's basketball players